Passyunk Township (Lenape Pahsayunk 'in the valley' from pahsaek 'valley') is a defunct township that was located in Philadelphia County, Pennsylvania. The township ceased to exist and was incorporated into the City of Philadelphia following the passage of the Act of Consolidation, 1854.

References

Additional sources
 Johnson, Amandus. The Swedish Settlements on the Delaware Volume I: Their History and Relation to the Indians, Dutch and English, 1638–1664 (1911)

See also

Fort Beversreede
New Sweden
Passyunk Square, Philadelphia

Municipalities in Philadelphia County prior to the Act of Consolidation, 1854
1854 disestablishments in Pennsylvania